Elvis Sakyi (born 24 November 1996) is a Ghanaian footballer who plays as a midfielder. Sakyi is a graduate of Kumasi Anglican High School where he played in the school team before joining Ghanaian lower-tier side Cheetah FC. He has had stints in Malta playing for Gżira United and Senglea Athletic. At the international level, he played for the Ghana national under-17 football team.

Early life 
Sakyi was born on 24 November 1996. He had his secondary school education at Kumasi Anglican High School where he played in the school's football team where he won several laurels including both the regional and national inter-schools championships.

Club career

Early career 
Sakyi began his career at Ghanaian side Cheetah FC before signing for Turkish team Istanbul Maltepespor in 2017 on a one-year deal. In 2016, the former Ghana U17 star underwent a trials at Turkish giants Galatasaray, Eskişehirspor and Yeni Malatyaspor before joining Maltepespor Kulubu. He failed to land a deal with Eskişehirspor due to an imposed transfer ban on the club. He went on and played in Northern Cyprus for Gençler Birliği S.K. based in Larnaca from 2018 to 2019.

Gżira United 
On 25 July 2019, Sakyi secured a move to Maltese-based team Gżira United, where he featured for the club mainly during their 2019–20 UEFA Europa League campaign. He made his debut after coming on in the 62nd minute for Ridwaru Adeyemo in the 2–0 loss against Hajduk Split during first leg of the first qualifying round. During the second leg, he was named on the starting line up, played until the 57th minute as they won the match by 3–1 to qualify on away goals to the next round for the first time in the club's history. He featured final 10 minutes in the first leg of the second qualifying round against Latvian side Ventspils which ended in a 4–0 loss to Gżira United but was absent during the second leg which ended in a 2–2 loss and 6–2 loss on aggregate and ended their Europa League journey. He terminated his contract with the club after two months.

Senglea Athletic 
After playing for Gżira United for just two months, Sakyi was signed by fellow Maltese club Senglea Athletic on a one-year deal in August 2019 and was handed the number 6 jersey ahead of the 2019–20 season. On 23 August 2019, he made his debut and played the full 90 minutes in a 1–1 draw against Sirens. He played 14 out of 20 league matches at the end of the season.

Maccabi Petah Tikva 
Sakyi moved to Israeli Premier League side Maccabi Petah Tikva as a free-agent in August 2020 after his contract with Maltese Premier League team Senglea Athletic FC expired. He made his debut on 30 August 2020, in a 2–1 victory over Maccabi Tel Aviv. He ended his first season playing 19 matches in all competitions, starting 16 of those matches.

Hapoel Afula F.C.

Sakyi moved to Hapoel Afula F.C. for one season.

International career 
Sakyi played for the Ghana national under-17 football team at the youth level.

References

External links 
 
 

Living people
1996 births
Ghanaian footballers
Cheetah F.C. players
Senglea Athletic F.C. players
Gżira United F.C. players
Maccabi Petah Tikva F.C. players
Hapoel Afula F.C. players
Maltese Premier League players
Israeli Premier League players
Liga Leumit players
Ghanaian expatriate footballers
Expatriate footballers in Malta
Expatriate footballers in Israel
Ghanaian expatriate sportspeople in Israel
Ghanaian expatriate sportspeople in Malta
Ghana youth international footballers
Association football midfielders